Oskar Steinvik (10 April 1908 - 24 August 1975) was a Norwegian politician for the Labour Party.

He served as a deputy representative in the Norwegian Parliament from Sør-Trøndelag during the term 1958–1961.

On the local level Steinvik was mayor of Frøya municipality from 1968 to his death in 1975.

References

1908 births
1975 deaths
Labour Party (Norway) politicians
Deputy members of the Storting
Mayors of Frøya, Sør-Trøndelag